The 1988 Eagle Classic was a men's WCT and Nabisco Grand Prix tennis tournament played on outdoor hard courts in Scottsdale, Arizona in the United States. It was the third edition of the tournament and was held from October 3 through October 9, 1988. Third-seeded Mikael Pernfors won the singles title.

Finals

Singles

 Mikael Pernfors defeated  Glenn Layendecker 6–2, 6–4
 It was Pernfors's 2nd singles title of the year and of his career.

Doubles

 Scott Davis /  Tim Wilkison defeated  Rick Leach /  Jim Pugh 6–3, 6–2
 It was Davis's only title of the year and the 9th of his career. It was Wilkison's 2nd title of the year and the 14th of his career.

See also
 1988 Virginia Slims of Arizona – women's tournament in Phoenix

References

External links
 ITF tournament edition details

 
Eagle Classic
Eagle Classic
Eagle Classic
Eagle Classic
Tennis Channel Open